Quemú Quemú Department is one of the 22 departments in La Pampa Province.  The capital city of the department is Quemú Quemú.

Places in Quemú Quemú Department
Colonia Barón

References

External links

Departments of La Pampa Province